Mythimna riparia is a species of moth of the family Noctuidae. It is found in Morocco, southern Europe, Turkey, Israel, Syria and Turkmenistan.

Adults are on wing from March to May and from September to October. There are two generations per year.

The larvae feed on various grasses, including Calamagrostis species and low herbaceous plants like Vicia and Trifolium species.

External links
 Hadeninae of Israel
 Three Mythimna new for the fauna of Serbia and Montenegro

Mythimna (moth)
Moths of Europe
Moths of Africa
Moths of Asia
Moths described in 1829